Slutty Summer is a 2004 romantic comedy film written and directed by Casper Andreas. It stars Casper Andreas, Jesse Archer, and Christos Klapsis. The film was premiered at the New York Lesbian and Gay Film Festival on June 11, 2004, and was shown at various other film festivals before its release in the United States on June 10, 2005.

Plot
Hunky writer Markus returns home to find his boyfriend of four years naked with another man. Newly single, he begins waiting tables at a swinging Chelsea hotspot where the indelible supporting cast of co-workers offers conflicting directions on the off-road map to love and lust in New York City.

Cast
Casper Andreas as Markus
Christos Klapsis as Julian
Virginia Bryan as 	Marilyn
Jeffrey Christopher Todd as Peter
Lance Werth as Kevin
Jesse Archer as Luke
Jamie Hatchett as Tyler
Lex Sosa as Steven
J.R. Rolley as Derek
Christophe Fraire as Peter's date
Colin Houston as Adam
Nick Toren as Larry

Reception
On review aggregator website Rotten Tomatoes, the film has a 11% approval rating based on 9 reviews, with an average ranking of 3.5/10. On Metacritic, Slutty Summer have a rank of 31 out of a 100 based on 7 critics, indicating "generally unfavorable reviews".

Matt Singer of The Village Voice wrote "First-timer Casper Andreas approaches his subject with the subtlety of a wrecking ball".

Writing for The New York Times, Ned Martel called the film "a labor of love".

References

External links

American LGBT-related films
2004 romantic comedy films
American romantic comedy films
2004 LGBT-related films
2000s English-language films
2000s American films